I'm Ready is a studio album by the Chicago blues musician Muddy Waters.  The second of his Johnny Winter-produced albums for the Blue Sky Records label, I'm Ready was issued one year after he found renewed commercial and critical success with Hard Again. The album earned Waters a Grammy Award in 1978.  It was reissued in 2004 by the Epic/Legacy, with three additional songs.

Track listing 
All tracks are composed by Muddy Waters (listed as McKinley Morganfield), except where noted.

Personnel 
 Muddy Waters – vocal, guitar
 Jimmy Rogers – guitar, vocals (track 11)
 Big Walter Horton – harmonica
 Bob Margolin – guitar, bass
 Pinetop Perkins – piano
 Willie "Big Eyes" Smith – drums
 Johnny Winter – guitar (tracks 1, 3, 4, 5, 7, 9)
 Jerry Portnoy – harmonica (tracks 1, 4, 5, 7, 9)

References

1978 albums
Muddy Waters albums
Albums produced by Johnny Winter
Blue Sky Records albums